The Dallara F317 is an open-wheel racing car developed by Italian manufacturer Dallara for use in all Formula Three categories. The F317 is the thirty-seventh car used by the FIA-sanctioned Formula Three championships. Although the F317 is only an aero-upgraded F312 chassis, it works as a replacement for the aging Dallara F312 chassis. However, some series like the Euroformula Open Championship opted for a slightly upgraded F312 chassis instead of the F317 package to keep costs low.

References

External links
 FIA Formula 3 European Championship official website
 All-Japan Formula Three Championship official website
 Formula 3 on dallara.it

Formula Three cars
Open wheel racing cars
F317